Hype is a 1981 album by singer Robert Calvert, the former frontman of British space-rock band Hawkwind.

It is subtitled The Songs of Tom Mahler as a tie-in to Calvert's only published novel Hype, the novel being a fictional account of the rise and death of a rock star.

The musicians used for the recording include three members of the band Bethnal, whom Calvert befriended during their support slot on Hawkwind's 1977 UK tour.

Track listing
All songs written by Robert Calvert.

"Over My Head" - 3:11
"Ambitious" - 3:37
"It's the Same" - 2:40
"Hanging Out On the Seafront" - 3:46
"Sensitive" - 3:37
"Evil Rock" - 4:39
"We Like to Be Frightened" - 2:59
"Teen Ballad of Deano" - 3:01
"Flight 105" - 3:53
"The Luminous Green Glow of the Dials of the Dashboard (At Night)" - 3:52
"Greenfly and the Rose" - 3:51
"Lord of the Hornets" - 3:58
Bonus Tracks 
"Over My Head" (different lyrics) 
"Flight 105" (instrumental) 
"Hanging Out On the Seafront" (different lyrics) 
"Lord of the Hornets" (different version)

Personnel
Robert Calvert – lead vocals, guitar, synthesizer, percussion
George Csapo – keyboards, violin, backing vocals
Nick Michaels – rhythm guitar
Pete Dowling – drums, electronic drums, percussion
Trev Thoms – lead guitar
Nik Turner – saxophone, backing vocals
Michael Moorcock – 12-string guitar, backing vocals
Peter Pavli – cello
Simon House – keyboards, violin, backing vocals
Jaqui - "hold me tight" vocals on "We Like to Be Frightened"

Release history
September 1981 – UK – A-Side Records (IF0311) vinyl
September 1989 – UK – See For Miles Records (SEECD 278) vinyl and CD
August 2003 – UK – Voiceprint Records (VP261CD) CD – with bonus tracks

References

1981 albums
Robert Calvert albums